The Randolph Township Schools are a comprehensive community public school district that serves children in pre-kindergarten through twelfth grade from Randolph, in Morris County, New Jersey, United States.

As of the 2020–21 school year, the district, comprising six schools, had an enrollment of 4,314 students and 382.3 classroom teachers (on an FTE basis), for a student–teacher ratio of 11.3:1.

Awards and recognition
The district was selected as one of the top "100 Best Communities for Music Education in America 2006" by the American Music Conference.

NAMM named the district in its 2008 survey of the "Best Communities for Music Education", which included 110 school districts nationwide.

The district's high school was the 16th-ranked public high school in New Jersey out of 339 schools statewide in New Jersey Monthly magazine's September 2016 cover story on the state's "Top Public High Schools", using a new ranking methodology.

Schools
Schools in the district (with 2020–21 enrollment data from the National Center for Education Statistics) are:
Elementary schools
Center Grove Elementary School with 466 students in grades PreK-5
Fernbrook Elementary School with 498 students in grades K-5
Ironia Elementary School with 436 students in grades K-5
Shongum Elementary School with 416 students in grades K-5
Middle school
Randolph Middle School with 1,009 students in grades 6-8
High school
Randolph High School with 1,475 students in grades 9-12

Board of education
The district's board of education, composed of nine members, sets policy and oversees the fiscal and educational operation of the district through its administration. As a Type II school district, the board's trustees are elected directly by voters to serve three-year terms of office on a staggered basis, with three seats up for election each year held (since 2012) as part of the November general election. The board appoints a superintendent to oversee the district's day-to-day operations and a business administrator to supervise the business functions of the district.

References

External links
Randolph Township Schools

Randolph Township Schools, National Center for Education Statistics

Randolph, New Jersey
New Jersey District Factor Group I
School districts in Morris County, New Jersey